Rolando Bianchi (born 15 February 1983) is an Italian former professional footballer who played as a striker.

With 77 total goals, he is Torino's 11th-highest all-time goal scorer. Bianchi was primarily known for his ability in the air.

Club career

Atalanta
A product of the Atalanta youth system, Bianchi made his Serie A debut at the age of 18 during the 2000–01 Serie A season. He played the final 10 minutes in a 2–1 loss to Juventus on 17 June 2001. His only appearance during the season. The following season he made an additional 3 appearances for the bergamaschi, while during the 2002–03 Serie A season he made 16 appearances. Despite being a prolific scorer in the youth ranks, he played 21 games for the first team without scoring any goals.

Cagliari
He was sold in co-ownership to Serie B team Cagliari in January 2004, where he played 14 matches and scored two goals helping them gain promotion to Serie A. The 2004–05 season, for which he remained at Cagliari, saw him score 2 goals in 25 matches.

Reggina
Bianchi was promptly sold to Reggina in 2005, where his first season was hampered by a serious knee injury suffered early on in the season. He recovered to play 9 games late in the season, scoring one goal.

The 2006–07 season saw Bianchi score 18 goals in 37 games. Due to their indictment for sporting fraud, the club had started the season with an 11-point deduction and seemed destined for relegation. They managed to save themselves, however, with Bianchi's performances considered a key part of Reggina's Serie A survival. He finished the season 4th in the league's goal scoring table.

Manchester City
His form for Reggina attracted the attention of clubs throughout Europe, and in July 2007 Bianchi moved to Manchester City for a reported fee of £8.8 million  (€13 million), where he was given the number 10 shirt. Bianchi scored on his debut for City against West Ham, slotting home from close range following a run and pass from Elano.
Bianchi's second goal came in a 2–1 victory in the Football League Cup 2nd round against Bristol City.  Bianchi then scored his third goal in English football in a 2–1 defeat against Tottenham on 9 December 2007. Then on the following Saturday he scored the first goal against Bolton in a 4–2 victory. Later that month, Bianchi criticised English cuisine and alcohol culture, and stated how he could never become a full international unless he returned to Serie A.

Loan to Lazio
In January 2008, Manchester City manager Sven-Göran Eriksson informed Bianchi that he would be allowed to leave the club. On 23 January 2008 Bianchi finalised a loan move to Lazio after not being able to settle in England. In his debut with Lazio on 27 January, Bianchi was sent off after picking up two yellow cards in just under five minutes, as the capital club drew 0–0 with Torino. He scored his first goal for Lazio against former club Reggina from a penalty kick in a 1–0 victory. In spite of Bianchi's hope that Lazio would make his move permanent, he had in fact been asked to return to Manchester City.

Torino
On 23 August 2008, after a summer of much speculation about a possible move, it was officially announced by Manchester City that Bianchi had signed for Italian club Torino on a five-year deal, for a fee of €5 million.

On 18 August 2012, Bianchi scored two goals in Torino's 4–2 defeat of U.S. Lecce in the Third Round of the Coppa Italia, Torino's first competitive game of the new season. He scored two goals in the 5–1 defeat of Atalanta on 30 September, reaching 70 goals with Torino. With these strikes, he entered into the Top 10 scorers for the club, tied with club legend, Ezio Loik. Bianchi helped the club to a 3–2 victory over Siena on 13 January 2013, heading in a cross from Valter Birsa in the later stages of the first-half.

Bologna and Atalanta
On 9 July 2013, Bianchi was signed by Bologna. Bologna relegated at the end of season. Bianchi wore no.9 shirt that season.

On 5 August 2014, Bianchi returned to Atalanta in a temporary deal, with Rubén Bentancourt moved to opposite direction. On the same day Bologna signed Daniele Cacia.

On 8 August 2015, he was released by Bologna.

Mallorca and Perugia
On 27 August 2015, Bianchi joined RCD Mallorca. After contributing with only two goals in 16 matches, he rescinded his contract and moved to Perugia.

Bianchi signed a -year contract with Perugia on 20 January 2016.

Pro Vercelli
On 19 February 2017, Bianchi signed with Pro Vercelli.

International career
In the summer of 2006, Bianchi was called up to the Italy U-21 squad for the 2006 U-21 Championships in Portugal, where he appeared 3 times and scored 1 goal.

References

External links
  
 
 
 Lega Serie A profile 
 
 

1983 births
Living people
Sportspeople from the Province of Bergamo
Italian footballers
Association football forwards
Serie A players
Serie B players
Cagliari Calcio players
Atalanta B.C. players
Reggina 1914 players
S.S. Lazio players
Torino F.C. players
Bologna F.C. 1909 players
A.C. Perugia Calcio players
Premier League players
Manchester City F.C. players
Segunda División players
RCD Mallorca players
Italy under-21 international footballers
Italy youth international footballers
Italian expatriate footballers
Italian expatriate sportspeople in England
Italian expatriate sportspeople in Spain
Expatriate footballers in England
Expatriate footballers in Spain
Footballers from Lombardy